New standard tuning (NST) is an alternative tuning for the guitar that approximates all-fifths tuning. The guitar's strings are assigned the notes C2-G2-D3-A3-E4-G4 (from lowest to highest); the five lowest open strings are each tuned to an interval of a perfect fifth {(C,G),(G,D),(D,A),(A,E)}; the two highest strings are a minor third apart (E,G).

All-fifths tuning is typically used for mandolins, cellos, violas, and violins. On a guitar, tuning the strings in fifths would mean the first string would be a high B. NST provides a good approximation to all-fifths tuning. Like other regular tunings, NST allows chord fingerings to be shifted from one set of strings to another.

NST's C-G range is wider, both lower and higher, than the E-E range of standard tuning in which the strings are tuned to the open notes E2-A2-D3-G3-B3-E4. The greater range allows NST guitars to play repertoire that would be impractical, if not impossible, on a standard-tuned guitar.

NST was developed by Robert Fripp, the guitarist for King Crimson. Fripp taught the new standard tuning in Guitar Craft courses beginning in 1985, and thousands of Guitar Craft students continue to use the tuning. Like other alternative tunings for guitar, NST provides challenges and new opportunities to guitarists, who have developed music especially suited to NST.

NST places the guitar strings under greater tension than standard tuning. Standard sets of guitar strings do not work well with the tuning as the lowest strings are too loose and the highest string may snap under the increased tension. Special sets of NST strings have been available for decades, and some guitarists have assembled NST sets from individual strings.

History

New standard tuning (NST) was invented by Robert Fripp of the band King Crimson in September 1983. 

Fripp began using the tuning in 1985 before beginning his Guitar Craft seminars, which have taught the tuning to three thousand guitarists.

The tuning is (from low to high):  C2-G2-D3-A3-E4-G4. The original version of NST was all-fifths tuning.
However, in the 1980s, Fripp never attained the all-fifth's high B. While he could attain A, the string's lifetime distribution was too short. Experimenting with a G string, Fripp succeeded. "Originally, seen in 5ths all the way, the top string would not go to B. so, as on a tenor banjo, I adopted an A on the first string. These kept breaking, so G was adopted."  In 2012, Fripp suggested that Guitar Circle members experiment with an A string (0.007) from Octave4Plus of Gary Goodman;  if successful, the experiment could lead to "the NST 1.2", C2G2D3A3E4-A4, according to Fripp. In 2010, Fripp suggested renaming the tuning as "Guitar Craft Standard Tuning or C Pentatonic tuning".

Properties

The lowest five strings are tuned in perfect fifths from a low C. The first string is a minor third up from the E to a G. Since the lowest five strings are tuned in fifths, guitars with NST can be played with the fingerings for chords and scales used on the violin, cello, and mandolin.

The first five strings of NST have all-fifths tuning, and so its all-fifths chords are movable around the fretboard. In contrast, standard tuning has an irregular major-third interjected among its perfect fourths, which complicates the learning of chords by beginners.

The distinct open-notes {C,G,D,A,E} are the notes of the major pentatonic scale on C, which contains only consonant intervals. The C-pentatonic scale omits the open B of standard tuning and all-fifths tuning, which forms a dissonant second-interval with C. With the 1980s King Crimson, Fripp had used pentatonic harmony in "Discipline",  "Thela Hun Ginjeet", and "Sartori in Tangier".

Harmonics: Overtones

New standard tuning lists four notes (C,G,E,G) from the harmonic sequence (overtones) for the note C. When the low open-note C-string is struck, its harmonic sequence begins with the notes
(C,C,G,C,E,G,B,C).
To strengthen a given chord, Vincent Persichetti's Twentieth-century harmony recommends adding perfect fifths above the initial overtones, rather than adding higher overtones, such as B and the higher C.  Persichetti's book influenced Fripp. In new standard tuning
 C is the fundamental overtone,
 G as a fifth reinforces C,
 D as a fifth reinforces G,
 A as a fifth reinforces D,
 E both as a fifth reinforces A and as the fifth overtone reinforces C, and 
 G as the sixth overtone reinforces C.

Range

Like all-fifths tuning, NST has a greater range than the standard tuning, a perfect fifth greater (a major third lower and a minor third higher).

Chords: Perfect intervals rather than thirds

Asked whether NST facilitates "new intervals or harmonies that aren't readily available in standard tuning", Fripp responded, "Yes, that's part of it.  It's more effective.  It's a more rational system, but it's also better sounding—better for chords, better for single notes." To build chords, Fripp uses "perfect intervals in fourths, fifths and octaves", so avoiding minor and major thirds. Quartal and quintal harmony was stressed from the beginning of Fripp's teaching of Guitar Craft. Fripp began a 1986 course with these directions: "Now, pick a note from the following series—[it was a series of fourths or fifths]. When you are ready—do not be in any hurry, but when you are ready play your note, then pick others and play them as the situation demands it. Your first note will be the first intentional note you have played in a week."

It is a challenge to adapt conventional guitar chords to new standard tuning. NST has wider intervals between consecutive strings than standard tuning.

Historical background
Modern quartal and quintal harmony revives the polyphonic traditions of medieval Europe. Before the common practice period, European polyphony emphasized unison intervals and octaves and also perfect fifths. From the Renaissance to 1900, Western symphonic music was diatonic, emphasizing the tertian harmony of major and minor scales, keys, and chords. Much popular music, especially rock, retains diatonic harmony.

String gauges

With traditional guitar strings, the low C may be loose and the high G may be too tight. Special gauges are therefore more suitable for NST. For steel-stringed acoustic-guitars, many Guitar-Craft participants use either an .011–.058 inch set or an .011–.059 inch set; string-sets may be purchased as a set from a manufacturer or purchased singly and assembled by the guitarist.

 
In 2012, a 0.007 inch gauge was being evaluated by Fripp and other members of Guitar Circle, who are considering replacing the first string's G note with an A note, the better to approximate the B note of all-fifths tuning. The 0.007 inch gauge was produced by Octave4Plus of Gary Goodman. Robert Fripp uses lighter strings for electric guitar.

Artists who use NST

Robert Fripp has used the New Standard Tuning since 1984.

Fripp has taught NST in his Guitar-Craft courses. In Guitar Craft and since 2010 in the successor Guitar Circles,  students use only New Standard Tuning. Having to use a new tuning, the students are challenged to approach their playing with greater mindfulness, putting to rest their habitual use of automatic chords or licks. With the new tuning, guitarists have to find new ways of musical expression.

The tuning is used by students of Guitar Craft, of which there have been three thousand. Guitar-Craft alumni who continue to practice NST are called "crafty guitarists" or "crafties". Some crafty guitarists formed The League of Crafty Guitarists (LCG), which toured with Robert Fripp and released several albums. The Guitar-Craft experience and the League of Crafty Guitarists trained guitarists who went on to form new bands, such as the California Guitar Trio and Trey Gunn; the California Guitar Trio and Gunn toured with Fripp as The Robert Fripp String Quintet. Other alumni of the League of Crafty Guitarists include members of Los Gauchos Alemanes, such as U.S. guitarist Steve Ball; Ball is associated with the Seattle Guitar Circle, along with LCG alumnus Curt Golden. 
The collection A Plague of Crafty Guitarists features the following Guitar-Craft alumni, who were listed in a review by Barry Cleveland: Tobin Buttram, Nigel Gavin, Geary Street Quartet, Bill Hibbits, Janssen and Jensen, Alejandro Miniaci and From Power Trio /Project , Sur Pacifico, Playmovil, and Santos Luminosos.
NST has been adapted for instruments besides guitar. Italian guitarist Fabio Mittino plays in NST. Trey Gunn (Crimson's warr guitar player from 1994 to 2003) and Markus Reuter (TUNER with Crimson drummer Pat Mastelotto) have adapted NST for their 8- and 10-string instruments; in 2007 Reuter used a B-F-C-G-D-A-C-D tuning. Finnish musician Heikki Malmberg uses a 7-string guitar tuned in NST with an additional low F. Additionally, British musician Michael Linden West plays the oud in NST.

See also

Notes

References

Further reading

External links
Courses in New Standard Tuning are offered by Guitar Circle, the successor of Guitar Craft:
           Guitar Circle of Europe
  Guitar Circle of Latin America
 Guitar Circle of North America
 The FraKctured Zone is a King Crimson fan website with notation and tabs to songs in NST (with acknowledgment to Trey Gunn for permission).
 

Robert Fripp
Regular guitar-tunings
Pentatonic scales